The Handbook of South American Indians is a monographic series of edited scholarly and reference volumes in ethnographic studies, published by the Smithsonian Institution between 1940 and 1947.

In 1932, Baron Erland Nordenskiöld agreed to edit the series for the National Research Council Division of Anthropology and Psychology; however, he died that year. The Smithsonian Institution agreed to sponsor the series but adequate funds were not approved by US Congress until 1940. Julian Steward edited the series. Ultimately, over a hundred scholars from Latin America, the United States, and Europe contributed and provided advice for the series.

This six-volume series, with an additional index volume, documents information about Indigenous peoples of South America, including cultural and physical aspects of the people, language family, history, and prehistory. This is a  reference work for historians, anthropologists, other scholars, and the general reader. The series utilizes noted authorities for each topic. The set is illustrated, indexed, and has extensive bibliographies. Volumes may be purchased individually.

Paul Radin reviewed the first four volumes, generally giving a favorable evaluation, but noting that the volumes are a "compromise between a handbook and a textbook." Radin criticizes the relative neglect of religion as a topic, as well as the neglect of functional aspects of indigenous cultures. He highly praises the inclusion of the cultures of the indigenous in the Southern Cone, which is new in the anthropological literature. He also esteems the article on Andean civilizations, while deeming the volume on the circum-Caribbean groups the weakest.

Bibliographic information 
Handbook of South American Indians / Julian H. Steward, General Editor. Washington, DC: Smithsonian Institution, 1940-1947.

Volume 1: The Marginal Tribes

Sections
 Indians of Southern South America
 Indians of the Gran Chaco
 The Indians of Eastern Brazil

Volume 2: The Andean Civilizations

Volume 3: The Tropical Forest Tribes

Sections
 The Coastal and Amazonian Tupi
 The Tribes of Mato Grosso and Eastern Bolivia
 Tribes of the Montana and Bolivian East Andes
 Tribes of the western Amazon Basin
 Tribes of the Guianas and the Left Amazon Tributaries

Volume 4: The Circum-Caribbean Tribes

Sections
 Central American Cultures
 The Cultures of Northwest South America
 The West Indies

Volume 5: The Comparative Ethnology of South American Indians

Sections
 A Cross-Cultural Survey of South American Indian Tribes
 Jesuit Missions in South America
 The Native Populations of South America
 South American Cultures: An Interpretative Summary

Volume 6: Physical Anthropology, Linguistics and Cultural Geography of South American Indians

Sections
 Ancient Man
 Physical Anthropology
 The languages of South American Indians
 Geography and Plant and Animal Resources

Volume 7: Index

See also
 Handbook of North American Indians
 Handbook of Middle American Indians
List of indigenous peoples of South America

Notes

External links
Volume 1: The Marginal Tribes., online at Biodiversity Heritage Library
Volume 2: The Andean Civilizations., BHL
Volume 3: The Tropical Forest Tribes., BHL
Volume 4: The Circum-Caribbean Tribes., BHL
Volume 5: The Comparative Ethnology of South American Indians., BHL
Volume 6: Physical Anthropology, Linguistics and Cultural Geography of South American Indians., BHL
Volume 7: Index., BHL

Monographic series
Encyclopedias of culture and ethnicity
Smithsonian Institution publications
Non-fiction books about indigenous peoples of the Americas
History of indigenous peoples of South America